Yann ar Floc'h (25 February 1881 – 2 July 1936), pseudonym of Jean Le Page, was a Breton folklorist.  He collected the oral traditions of the Aulne region in the department of Finistère and published them in Breton periodicals.  He was one of the few folklorists of that time to publish this kind of material in the Breton language.  These texts were posthumously published in the collection Koñchennou eus Bro ar Ster Aon ("Folk-tales from the Aulne river country").

Publication 

Notably, Yann ar Floc'h collected in 1905 the longest known oral version of the history of King Mark, a version that is of great interest in the study of this character; it blends the legend of Ys, with the premise that Marc was condemned by Gradlon's daughter  (or Dahut). These tales form "the original narration of folk traditions" and are representative of the renewal of popular Breton literature in prose at the beginning of the 20th century.

Editions

References

Sources

External links 

Koñchennoù eus Bro ar Ster Aon at Breton Wikisource

1881 births
1936 deaths
Breton-language writers
French folklorists
People from Finistère
Pseudonymous writers